Hwang Seung-eon (born October 31, 1988) is a South Korean actress, model and singer. She was a member of the co-ed project group Temporary Idols under YG Entertainment. She has appeared in numerous films, television series, variety shows, and music videos. She is best known for her roles in Let's Eat 2 (2015), Madame Antoine: The Love Therapist (2016),  Love for a Thousand More (2016),  Time (2018), XX (2020), When I Was the Most Beautiful (2020) and Alice (2020).

Early life
Hwang was born in Yeonhui-dong, Seodaemun District, Seoul, South Korea on October 31, 1988. She attended Anyang Arts High School and graduated from Kyung Hee University. She started acting when she was in her third year of high school, and she was also an idol trainee.

Career

2009–2013: Career beginnings
Hwang Seung-eon started her entertainment career by appearing as a friend of actress Im Jung-eun in MBC's entertainment program, Introduce the Star's Friend, which was broadcast in December 2008. 

She made her acting debut in 2009, in the horror film A Blood Pledge as Park Ji-mi, which was released on June 18, 2009. In August 2009, she starred in the horror film Yoga Hakwon. She made a cameo in City of Fathers playing the role as Mina. In 2010, Hwang made her television series debut in the 2010 MBC TV Golden Fish, playing the role of Yoon Myeong-ji, a housekeeper. In December 2011, she played Lee Joo-hee, a ghost who haunts Yeo-ri (Son Ye-jin) in the horror film, Spellbound, starring Son Ye-jin and Lee Min-ki. She was also cast in Drama Special – Ji-hoon's Born in 1982.

In 2012, Hwang was cast as the lead in the short film The Trinity and also Whatcha Wearin'?.

2014–2016: Rising popularity and departure from Urban Works Media
She made several cameos in films and appeared in short films in 2014. Her popularity rose after her lead role in  The King of Jokgu, where she was nominated for the Best New Actress at the 2nd Wildflower Film Awards. It was announced that Hwang would be cast in the OCN drama Bad Guys and MBC Every 1's Sweden Laundry. In 2015, Hwang joined the cast of Heart to Heart which aired on January 9, 2015. She also starred on Sweet 20. She gained more attention after she was cast in Let's Eat 2.
 
Hwang was cast as the lead in the JTBC drama Madame Antoine: The Love Therapist along with actor Han Ye-seul and Sung Joon which was delayed to January 22, 2016 after the originally planned November 27, 2015. Later that year, she made a cameo in  Signal before she was cast as the main lead of Thumping Spike.

She officially left Urban Works Media in 2016.

2016–present: YG Entertainment, music debut and continued success
Hwang joined YG Entertainment and its model agency YG KPlus on October 26, 2016. She then starred as the female lead in the YG produced web series, Love for a Thousand More aired on December 5, 2016.

Hwang was nominated for the Golden Acting Award, Actress in a Miniseries at the 2017 MBC Drama Awards for her role in Man Who Dies to Live. She made a cameo in Jugglers before taking up a supporting role in I'm Not a Robot. Together with Kim Hee-jung, Lee Su-hyun, Kwon Hyun-bin and Kwon Young-deuk, Hwang was part of the project group Temporary Idols formed by YG Entertainment in collaboration with SBS for the television series of the same name. The drama was aired on SBS and Netflix. They released 2 songs, "Red Carpet" and "Ice Cafe".

In January 2018, Hwang was cast as Lee Roo-mi in the web series XX. Hwang, alongside Kim Jung-hyun, Seohyun and Kim Jun-han starred in MBC melodrama Time. She was nominated for the Excellence Award, Actress in a Wednesday-Thursday Miniseries at the 2018 MBC Drama Awards. She made a cameo in Touch Your Heart and  starred in the tvN Drama Stage My Uncle is Audrey Hepburn. With Im Soo-hyang, Ji Soo and Ha Seok-jin, Hwang was cast as the lead role in When I Was the Most Beautiful where she was nominated for Excellence Award, Actress in a Wednesday-Thursday Miniseries at the 2020 MBC Drama Awards. It was announced that Hwang would be starring in the science-fiction television series Alice.

In January 2021, Hwang signed with C-JeS Entertainment. Hwang was part of the cast of You Are My Spring aired on July 5, 2021. She also made a cameo in Police University in 2021.

In March 2022, Hwang confirmed to join KakaoTV original drama,  Marriage White Paper alongside Lee Jin-wook and Lee Yeon-hee. She will play as  Choi Hee-sun, a co-worker of Na-eun (Lee Yeon-hee). This drama will broadcast within this year.

Discography

Singles

Filmography

Film

Television series

Web series

Television shows

Hosting

Music video appearances

Awards and nominations

References

External links
Hwang Seung-eon at C-JeS Entertainment
 
 
 

1988 births
Living people
People from Seoul
Kyung Hee University alumni
21st-century South Korean actresses
South Korean film actresses
South Korean television actresses
South Korean web series actresses
South Korean television personalities
Changwon Hwang clan